is a professional Japanese baseball player. He plays infielder for the Tokyo Yakult Swallows.

References 

2001 births
Living people
Baseball people from Chiba Prefecture
Japanese baseball players
Nippon Professional Baseball infielders
Tokyo Yakult Swallows players